The NWA Heritage Championship is a title sanctioned by the National Wrestling Alliance.

Title history

Combined reigns

See also
National Wrestling Alliance
CWFH Heritage Heavyweight Championship

References

External links
 NWA Heritage Championship History On TitleHistories.com
 NWAWrestling.com

Heavyweight wrestling championships
Regional professional wrestling championships